The Sydney Gateway is an under-construction major road interchange between the WestConnex and the airport terminals of Sydney Airport. Construction began in early 2021 and is expected to open in December 2024. It was originally planned to open in late 2023 in conjunction with the M4–M8 Link. 
The Sydney Gateway will also be constructed in conjunction with the duplication of the nearby Port Botany freight rail line, which is managed by the Australian Rail Track Corporation.

Upon completion, the Sydney Gateway will connect the Sydney Motorway Network with the Sydney Airport and Port Botany precincts via St Peters Interchange. The completed project is expected to provide improved road links between the airport and Port Botany and reduce congestion.

Alignment
The Sydney Gateway starts at the St Peters Interchange, the junction of the M8 Motorway and M4–M8 Link, all of which are being built as part of WestConnex. Viaducts will be built over Canal Road, the Port Botany freight rail line and Tempe Lands. Further southwest, the Sydney Gateway splits into two, leading to Airport Drive and Qantas Drive towards the west and east respectively. A section of Airport Drive will be closed permanently and traffic will have to use Sydney Gateway to access between the international and domestic terminals.

A one-way elevated viaduct will also be built linking Qantas Drive towards the Sir Reginald Ansett Drive and the domestic terminals precinct, bypassing two signalised intersections with Seventh Street and O'Riordan Street. This will enable travel from Sydney's motorway network to the international and domestic terminals without stopping at a single traffic light.

A single traffic light will be located along the Sydney Gateway for access to and from Link Road. The rest of the Sydney Gateway will be free-flowing traffic.

Tolls
The completed roadway will be toll-free. However, this only applies to traffic between Airport Drive and Qantas Drive, as any traffic using St Peters Interchange to/from Sydney Gateway must also use the WestConnex tunnels and pay WestConnex tolls.

History

Planning
A 2017 proposal by Lendlease was not accepted. The rail line duplication was originally Stage 2 of the Sydney Gateway and is separately managed by the Australian Rail Track Corporation. Stages 1 and 3 then formed the remainder of the project managed by the state government.

The proposed alignment passes over Sydney Airport land, which is leased from the Commonwealth government. As such, the project must undergo both state and Commonwealth (federal) planning processes. In addition to an Environmental Impact Statement (EIS) as required by state planning process, a Major Development Plan (MDP) is also required before major development at a leased airport can occur. Planning approvals from both the federal and state planning ministers are also required. A combined EIS and MDP was released for exhibition on 20 November 2019. The project was approved by the state planning minister on 27 August 2020. The project was approved by the federal planning minister on 23 September 2020.

Construction
Expressions of interest to construct the Sydney Gateway commenced in July 2019. In October 2019, three shortlists were announced:
AirPortConnex led by Salini Impregilo
John Holland and Seymour Whyte joint venture
CPB Contractors

In November 2020, the John Holland Seymour Whyte joint venture (JHSWJV) was awarded the design and construction contract. Construction began in early 2021 and the motorway is expected to open in December 2024. It was originally planned to open in late 2023, together with the M4–M8 Link.

In August 2021, the project's Construction Environment Management Plan (CEMP) was approved by the state Department of Planning, Industry and Environment, allowing construction work to be started on state land.

Future
The South East Sydney Transport Strategy, released by Transport for NSW in August 2020, proposed a potential extension of Sydney Gateway to Port Botany by 2056, with grade separation at General Holmes Drive, as well as ramps connecting to Canal Road.

See also

WestConnex

References

External links
Sydney Gateway project information. Transport for NSW
Sydney Gateway project overview & map. Transport for NSW. Autumn 2019

Road interchanges in Australia
Highways in Sydney